Shaaw Tláa, also known as Kate Carmack ( – 29 March 1920), was a Tagish First Nation woman who was one of the party that first found gold in the Klondike River in 1896, and is sometimes credited with being the person who made the actual discovery.

Early years
Born near Bennett Lake, she lived with her parents, and seven sisters and brothers, near Carcross, Yukon.  Her father, Kaachgaawáa, was the head of the Tlingit crow clan, while her mother, Gus’dutéen, was a member of the Tagish wolf clan. Her name in Tlingit means "gumboot mother". As a young woman, she married her first cousin, Kult’ús. In the early 1880s, her husband and their infant daughter died of influenza in Alaska, at which time Shaaw Tláa returned to her village. It was here, in 1887, that Shaaw Tláa's brother, Keish (Skookum Jim Mason), and nephew, Dawson Charlie (K̲áa Goox̱) started a packing, hunting, and prospecting partnership with George Washington Carmack, an American. She became Carmack's common-law wife within the year. She took the name Kate Carmack.

Beginning in 1889, and for the next six years, the couple lived in the Forty Mile region.  Carmack prospected, trapped, and traded, while Shaaw Tláa made winter clothing that she sold to miners.  They had one daughter, Graphie Grace Carmack (born 1893, Fort Selkirk).

Gold discovery

Kate and her husband were fishing for salmon at the mouth of the Klondike River in August 1896, when a party led by her brother, including two nephews, came looking for her. The party then discovered gold in Rabbit Creek (later renamed Bonanza Creek), setting in motion the Klondike Gold Rush. Some accounts claim that Kate made the actual discovery.

After becoming wealthy, the Carmacks moved to Hollister, California, to live with Carmack's sister, Rose Watson (later known as Rose Curtis). Subsequently, Carmack left California, Kate, Graphie, and his former partners. Kate and Graphie stayed with Rose. George Carmack married Marguerite Laimee in 1900 in Olympia, Washington. Kate, unable to prove she was George's lawful wife and deemed ineligible for alimony, returned to Carcross in July.

Later years
Keish built her a cabin near his, and daughter, Graphie attended mission and residential schools in Carcross and Whitehorse that were run by Bishop William Carpenter Bompas, before Graphie moved to Seattle, Washington.

Kate Carmack died of influenza during the worldwide influenza epidemic of 1918-1920 in Carcross.

In recognition of her presence when the first gold nugget was removed from Bonanza Creek, Carmack was inducted into Canada's Mining Hall of Fame in 2018. Her contributions includes helping her family members survive by providing food and clothing. Her husband, brother, and nephew were honored for their gold discoveries by the Mining Hall of Fame two decades prior to Carmack.

References

Sources

External links 
Biography at the Dictionary of Canadian Biography Online

19th-century births
1920 deaths
19th-century First Nations people
20th-century First Nations people
Deaths from Spanish flu
Infectious disease deaths in Yukon
People from Carcross, Yukon
People of the Klondike Gold Rush
Tagish people
First Nations women